Bivetopsia is a genus of sea snails, marine gastropod mollusks in the family Cancellariidae, the nutmeg snails.

Species
Species within the genus Bivetopsia include:
 Bivetopsia chrysostoma (G.B. Sowerby I, 1832)
 Bivetopsia haemastoma (G.B. Sowerby I, 1832) 
 Bivetopsia rugosa (Lamarck, 1822)

References

 Hemmen J. (2007). Recent Cancellariidae, Annotated and illustrated catalogue of Recent Cancellariidae. Privately published, Wiesbaden. 428 pp. [With amendments and corrections taken from Petit R.E. (2012) A critique of, and errata for, Recent Cancellariidae by Jens Hemmen, 2007. Conchologia Ingrata 9: 1-8.

External links

Cancellariidae
Gastropod genera
Taxa named by Félix Pierre Jousseaume